Jose Lorenzo de Ocampo (1906–1995) was a Filipino architect and artist.

Personal life
Born on February 18, 1906, he was the oldest child of José Gabriel de Ocampo and Felicia Gómez. He was first educated at Colegio de La Inmaculada Concepción in Vigan, Ilocos Sur, then moved to Manila and studied at the Ateneo de Manila and the Mapúa Institute of Technology. He eventually received his Bachelor of Science degree in Architecture at the University of Santo Tomas.

He married Carmen Ravasco y Nakpil of Santa Cruz, Manila, on May 26, 1934, Together, they had 8 children.

He is best known for his work on the Antipolo Cathedral which was completed in 1954 after.the old church was destroyed during World War II.

After his architectural career, he relocated to San Mateo, California, where he retired and devoted himself to painting and other visual arts..He died in San Mateo on September 25, 1995.

Works

Churches
Antipolo Cathedral - Antipolo, Rizal
Saint Joseph Church - Trozo, Manila
Santa Rita Orphanage Chapel -  Paranaque
Teresa Town Church - Teresa, Rizal (1951)

Colleges
St. Paul's College (addition to school building) - Bocaue, Bulacan
St. Paul's College - Paranaque
San Joseph College - Cavite
Saint Rita College - San Sebastian, Quiapo, Manila
Santa Rita College - San Carlos, Negros
Santa Rita Novitiate - Tagaytay City, Cavite
University of Santo Tomas nurses homes (collaborative project) - Manila

Hotels
Globe Hotel and Restaurant (later changed to Mamon Luk restaurant) - Quiapo, Manila
Swiss Inn - Manila (remodel)

Medical offices 
 Dr. Oscar M. Andres – Galt, California
 Dr. Jesus C. Delgado Clinic – Quezon City
 ZODIAC Pharmaceutical – Manila (remodel)

Apartments 
Mr. and Mrs. Jesus Andres – Kamuning, Quezon City
Mr. and Mrs. Numeriano Bustillios – Bali-Bali, Quezon City
Dona Felisa G. de Ocampo – Santa Cruz, Manila
Dr. and Mrs. Jesus C. Delgado – Kamuning, Quezon City
Mr. and Mrs. Rafael Gomez – Mandaluyong, Rizal
Dr. and Mrs. Pedro Narciso – Azcarraga (now Claro M. Recto) and Mendiola, Manila
Mr. and Mrs. Antonio Santisteban – Manila
Swiss Inn – Manila

Residences 
Bishop of Zamboanga, Msgr. Luis Del Rosario, S.J. – Zamboanga City (1952)
Dr. and Mrs. Jesus C. Delgado – Lantana St., Quezon City
Dr. and Mrs. Jesus C. Delgado – Sampaloc Ave., Quezon City
Mr. and Mrs. Jose Del Carman – Santa Mesa, Manila
Mr. and Mrs. Antonio de Ocampo – Santa Mesa, Manila
Dona Carmen R. de Ocampo – Little Baguio, San Juan, Rizal
Dona Felisa G. de Ocampo – Santa Mesa, Manila
Atty. Jose Galan Blanco – San Juan, Rizal
Mr. and Mrs. Rafael Gomez – Santa Mesa, Manila
Mr. and Mrs. Jose M. Hernandez
Dr. and Mrs. Pedro Narciso – San Jaun, Rizal
Mr. and Mrs. Ernesto Paguio
Mr. and Mrs. Pedro N. Ravasco – Mandaluyong, Rizal
Mr. and Mrs. Richard Swesiger – San Juan, Rizal

Painting 
 "Coronation of Sta. Rita de Casia", 1927, oil on canvas. National Gallery of Art, Manila, Philippines
 Pope John Paul I – on display at St. Timothy’s Church, San Mateo, California
 Pope John Paul II – on display St. Timothy’s Church, San Mateo, California
 Five pastors of St. Timothy Church (Fr. Joseph A. Fitzpatrick, Fr. J. Norman Allen, Fr. George R. Meyer, Fr. Robert Kevin White, and Fr. Vincent D. Ring)
 President Corazon Aquino of the Philippines
 The children of Bob & Mary Werderman of Belmont, California
 Mark, Eymard, and Hedwig de Ocampo of San Mateo, California
 Ann Feriante of San Mateo, California
 Four pastors of All Souls Church in South San Francisco, California
 Msgr. Timothy Gallahan, Pastor of St. Matthew’s Church, San Mateo, California
 Msgr. Francisco Avendano, Honorary Prelate, Antipolo, Rizal
 Mrs. Da Rosa

References 

 http://eye-in-the-blue-sky.blogspot.com/2015/03/feast-your-eyes-on-masterpieces-at.html

1995 deaths
1906 births
Ateneo de Manila University alumni
Mapúa University alumni
University of Santo Tomas alumni
People from Vigan